Spencer Sanders (born December 15, 1999) is an American football quarterback who plays college football for Ole Miss. He previously played for the Oklahoma State Cowboys before transferring in 2023.

Early life and high school
Sanders grew up in Denton, Texas and attended Billy Ryan High School. He passed for 3,288 yards and 35 touchdowns along with 1,099 yards and 18 touchdowns on the ground in his junior season before tearing his ACL. Rated a four-star recruit, Sanders committed to play college football at Oklahoma State during his junior year over offers from Colorado, Ole Miss, North Carolina, Penn State and Texas A&M. As a senior, Sanders threw for 3,845 yards and 54 touchdowns and ran for 1,380 yards and 16 touchdowns and was named the Gatorade Player of the Year, the Associated Press Player of the Year, and Texas Mr. Football.

College career

Oklahoma State
Sanders redshirted his true freshman season. After competing with Dru Brown throughout spring practice and summer training camp, Sanders was named the Cowboys starting quarterback just before the season opener. Sanders was named the Big 12 Conference Newcomer of the Week for week 2 after throwing for 250 yards and three touchdowns on 12 of 18 passing with 51 yards rushing in slightly more than one half of play against McNeese State. Sanders was named the Newcomer of the Week a second time after completing nine of 12 passes for 158 yards and two touchdowns while rushing for another 88 yards in a 34–27 win against TCU. The following game against Kansas Sanders suffered a torn ligament in his throwing hand, ending his redshirt freshman season. He threw for 2,065 yards with 16 touchdowns and 11 interceptions while rushing for 625 yards and two touchdowns and was named the conference Offensive Freshman of the Year.

Sanders suffered an ankle injury in the first quarter of 2020 season opening game against Tulsa and missed the following game. He finished the season with 2,007 passing yards with 14 touchdowns and eight interceptions. Sanders was named the MVP of the 2020 Cheez-It Bowl after passing for 305 yards and four touchdowns in a 37–34 win against the Miami Hurricanes.

Sanders missed the opener of his redshirt junior season against Missouri State after he tested positive for COVID-19. He passed for 214 yards and one touchdown and 93 yards and another touchdown in Oklahoma State's 37–33 rivalry game victory against Oklahoma. Sanders was named first team All-Big 12 after completing 243 of 392 pass attempts for 2,839 yards and 20 touchdown passes against 12 interceptions and 668 rushing yards with six touchdowns.

On December 5, 2022, it was reported by multiple sources that Sanders intended to enter the transfer portal.

Ole Miss
On January 19, 2023, Sanders transferred to Ole Miss.

Statistics

References

External links
Oklahoma State Cowboys bio

1999 births
Living people
American football quarterbacks
Oklahoma State Cowboys football players
Players of American football from Texas
Sportspeople from Denton, Texas
Ole Miss Rebels football players